The 1909 Arizona football team was an American football team that represented the University of Arizona as an independent during the 1909 college football season. In its second and final season under head coach H. B. Galbraith, the team compiled a 3–1 record, shut out three of four opponents, and outscored all opponents by a total of 71 to 23. The team captain was Thomas Briggs Rice.

Schedule

References

Arizona
Arizona Wildcats football seasons
Arizona football